The 1966 Campeonato Profesional was the 19th season of Colombia's top-flight football league. 14 teams competed against one another. Santa Fe won their fourth league title.

Background and league system
14 teams competed in the tournament: the same 13 teams from the previous tournament as well as Junior, who returned to the competition after a 13-year absence with the bulk of the team that made up the Colombia national football team during the qualification tournament for the 1966 FIFA World Cup.

The tournament was once again played under a round-robin format, with every team playing each other four times (twice at home and twice away) for a total of 52 matches. Teams received two points for a win and one point for a draw. If two or more teams were tied on points, places were determined by goal difference. The team with the most points became the champion of the league. 364 matches were played during the season, with a total of 1188 goals scored.

Santa Fe won the championship for the fourth time, the runners-up were Independiente Medellín. Both teams qualified for the 1967 Copa Libertadores, marking the return of Colombian clubs to the competition after FIFA lifted the two-year suspension on the Colombian Football Federation due to the conflict between the FIFA-recognized Asociación de Fútbol Colombiano (Adefútbol) and DIMAYOR. Argentine player Omar Devani, who played for Santa Fe, was the season's top goalscorer with 31 goals.

Teams

Standings

Top goalscorers

Source: RSSSF.com Colombia 1966

References

External links 
Dimayor official website

1966 in Colombian football
Colombia
Categoría Primera A seasons